Tyro Payments Limited (Tyro) is an Australian financial "fintech" institution (neobank) specialising in merchant credit, debit and EFTPOS acquiring.

History
Tyro was founded in 2003 by Peter Haig, Andrew Rothwell and Paul Wood as MoneySwitch Ltd. Tyro was the first new entrant into the Australian EFTPOS business since 1996. It was the second company in Australia to be granted a Specialist Credit Card Institution (SCCI) licence after GE Capital.

In 2015, Tyro was granted a "banking licence", becoming an "Authorised Deposit taking Institution (ADI)". It was the first Australian technology company to be granted this licence by the Australian Prudential Regulatory Authority.

In October 2016, Tyro appointed Gerd Schenkel, founder of UBank and Telstra Digital as its new CEO. Gerd resigned in June 2017.
In January 2018,
Tyro appointed Robbie Cooke as CEO. Cooke was formerly managing director of Tatts Group.

In June 2022, Tyro announced the resignation of CEO Robbie Cooke concluding close to five years of leadership at Tyro. Following an executive search process, Tyro announced Jonathan (Jon) Davey was appointed as the new CEO with official commencement on October 3. Jon Davey had led Tyro’s health business unit, following Tyro’s acquisition of health fintech Medipass. 

In January 2021, Tyro experienced a terminal connectivity issue that impacted a limited number of its terminals. The issue was detected on the evening of 5 January 2021, and by 27 January 2021 Tyro reported that the only a limited number of merchants that were still impacted. In total, Tyro claimed that 70% of all of Tyro's merchants were unaffected by the incident, while 11% of merchants had at least one terminal fully functional at their business premises with the remaining 19% of merchants completely impacted. On 15 January Tyro requested a trading halt on its shares on the same day a short selling firm, Viceroy Research, published a report alleging that a large number of terminals were taken down. Tyro lodged a response to these claims to the Australian Securities Exchange on 19 January 2021, with Viceroy publishing a follow-up on 20 January 2021.

Growth

In 2012, Tyro exceeded $3.5 billion of card transaction volume.

On 1 March 2016, Tyro completed an equity capital raising of $100,127,532.00 at a price per share of $1.0361 led by Tiger Global, TDM Asset Management, and Atlassian co-founder Mike Cannon-Brookes.

In Financial Year 2016, Tyro grew to $8.6 billion of transaction volume, a growth of 26% compared to the prior year.

In the first half of Financial Year 2017, Tyro processed $5.3 billion in payments, a growth rate of 23%, and generated revenue of $59 million, a growth of 28%. Tyro's employee base grew by 40% to 344 people.

In February 2017, Tyro became the first bank to implement payments via Siri. At the same time, Tyro announced a partnership with Afterpay.

On 22 July 2020, the share price of Tyro Payments Ltd is down by 4.17%, after the payment processing provider published the new amounts of transactions.

As of 17 May 2022, the share price is $1.08, down 70% over the preceding 12 months.

Strategy

Tyro self-describes its strategy to compete with the major banks as "nextgen banking" focusing on Small and Medium Enterprises (SMEs).

As part of that, Tyro is lobbying for a more open data exchange in the traditional banking industry.

Tyro is a regular contributor to the national discussion of financial services regulation
and it participates on the Prime Minister's advisory panel.

On 1 April 2017, Tyro received the authority to call itself a "bank."

Awards
Tyro has been awarded "Deloitte Technology Fast 50" in 2012, 2013, and 2014; "Deloitte Fast 500 Asia Pacific" in 2012, 2013, 2014, and 2015; "BRW Fast 100" in 2010, 2011, 2012, and 2013.

In 2016 Tyro was named "43rd most innovative fintech in the world" by the KPMG H2 Fintech100 survey.
Also in 2016, Tyro's founders won the "2016 NSW Pearcey Tech Entrepreneur of the year" award.

See also
 Afterpay

References

External links
 Official website

2003 establishments in Australia
Banks established in 2003
Financial services companies established in 2003
Financial services companies based in Sydney
Neobanks